Adilet Law Academy is a university located in Almaty, Kazakhstan. The curriculum is taught in Kazakh and Russian. The degree attainment is Bachelors.

References

Universities in Kazakhstan